Goheen is a surname. Notable people with the surname include:

Barry Goheen, American collegiate basketball player and attorney 
Charles A. Goheen (1843-1899), American Union soldier
Earl Goheen (1895–1985), American football, basketball and baseball coach
John Lawrence Goheen (1883–1948), American missionary, educator and administrator
Moose Goheen (1894–1979), American ice hockey player
Robert F. Goheen (1919–2008), American academic administrator and diplomat